The team all-around is an artistic gymnastics event held at the Summer Olympics. The event was first held for men at the third modern Olympics in 1904 but was only contested by teams from the United States.  In 1908 and onwards it was contested by multiple different nations.  The women's competition was added in 1928, skipped in 1932,  and was re-added in 1936. It has been contested at every Olympic Games since.

Medalists

Men

Team medal counts

Women

Team medal counts

Individuals with multiple team medals

References 

Team all-around
Olympics